The Bourassa Royal or Le Royal de Bourassa is a Canadian ringette team in Canada's National Ringette League (NRL) which competes in the Eastern Conference in the White division. Founded in 2004 and based in Quebec, the team recruits players from Bourassa-Laval-Lanaudière. The team has been inactive in the recent years of the NRL.

From its inaugural season in 2004 until the 2011–12 season, the team was called the BLL Nordiques after which it became "Bourassa Royal".

Team history

The Bourassa Royal have played in the National Ringette League since its formation in 2004. For several years, the name of the team was BLL Nordiques. BLL is the acronym for Bourassa-Laval-Lanaudière area in Quebec.

For the 2011-12 season, the BLL Nordiques team became renamed, Bourassa Royal (short for Le Royal de Bourassa). Reasons cited were recent changes in the BLL (Bourassa/Laval/Lanaudière) region. As a consequence, the BLL Nordiques were transferred to the local association of Bourassa, which was considered a move that would allow players to have better training opportunities.

2011-12 NRL Season

2011-12 Roster

2011-12 Coaching staff 

  Head Coach:  Yves Leclair
  Assistant Coach: Alain Berthelet 
  Assistant Coach: Audrey Dalton
  Media Relations: Mélanie Leclair

Reference

Other teams
The Bourassa Royal has competed against a number of other NRL teams including the Cambridge Turbos, Montreal Mission, Calgary RATH, Rive-Sud Révolution, and the Atlantic Attack.

See also

 Ringette
 National Ringette League
 Cambridge Turbos
 Atlantic Attack
 Montreal Mission
 Calgary RATH
 Rive-Sud Révolution

References

External links
  Bourassa Royal website 

Ringette
National Ringette League
NRL
Sports teams in Quebec
Sport in Laval, Quebec
Sports clubs established in 2004
2004 establishments in Quebec
Ringette players
Women's sports teams
Women's sports teams in Canada